The Goilalan or Wharton Range languages are a language family spoken around the Wharton Range in the "Bird's Tail" of New Guinea. They were classified as a branch of the Trans–New Guinea languages by Stephen Wurm (1975), but only tentatively retained there in the classification of Malcolm Ross (2005) and removed entirely by Timothy Usher (2020).

Languages
The languages are,
Fuyug
Tauade
Northern (Kunimaipa): Biangai, Kunimaipa, Weri

The languages are clearly related, especially northern Biagai, Kunimaipa, and Weri, which might be considered divergent dialects.

Pronouns
Pronouns are:

Northern: 1sg ne, 2sg ni, 3sg pi
Tauade/Fuyug: 1sg na, 2sg nu

Tauade also has the possessive pronouns , .

Vocabulary comparison
The following basic vocabulary words are from SIL field notes (1973, 1975, 1980), as cited in the Trans-New Guinea database:

{| class="wikitable sortable"
! gloss !! Fuyug !! Tauade
|-
! head
| hul ha; ondobe || kɔrɔtɔ
|-
! hair
| are; hul haluma || awutu
|-
! ear
| gadolo || kepapaí
|-
! eye
| hul li; im || tavai
|-
! nose
| hul hunga; unge || kiːtʰ
|-
! tooth
| hul usi || nɔtɔvai
|-
! tongue
| hul asese || aivi
|-
! leg
| soga || lɔ'vai
|-
! louse
| hi || dautʰ
|-
! dog
| ho; oi || kɔveřa
|-
! pig
| ovo || pɔřu
|-
! bird
| Nemba; nembe || kide
|-
! egg
| hulombo || mutuwu
|-
! blood
| tana || il'iví
|-
! bone
| hude || keniví
|-
! skin
| hul hoda; ode || kɔtipai
|-
! breast
| hul duda || data
|-
! tree
| i'i || eata
|-
! man
| A'a; an || baře
|-
! woman
| Amu; amuri || iva
|-
! sun
| evuli || vatava
|-
! moon
| hama || ɔne
|-
! water
| ʒu || ipi
|-
! fire
| oki || e'na·m
|-
! stone
| zo || evi'ti
|-
! road, path
| enamba; inambe || bɔřiƀařa
|-
! name
| ifa || ape'te
|-
! eat
| huni nene || ɔmei nai
|-
! one
| fida || kɔne
|-
! two
| ʒuvalo || kupal'iai
|}

Evolution
Fuyuge reflexes of purported proto-Trans-New Guinea (pTNG) etyma are:

baba ‘father’ < *mbapa
sabe ‘saliva’ < *si(mb,p)at
magata ‘mouth, jaw’ < *maŋgat[a]
mele-pila ‘tongue’ < *mele-mbilaŋ
imu ‘eye’ < *(ŋg,k)amu
ije ‘tree’ < *inda

References

 
Binanderean–Goilalan languages
Languages of Central Province (Papua New Guinea)